Gro Sandberg  (born 25 April 1956) is a Norwegian artistic gymnast.

She was born in Hokksund. She competed at the 1972 Summer Olympics.

References

External links 
 

1956 births
Living people
People from Øvre Eiker
Norwegian female artistic gymnasts
Olympic gymnasts of Norway
Gymnasts at the 1972 Summer Olympics
Sportspeople from Viken (county)
20th-century Norwegian women